Perom (also known as Parūm and Perūm) is a village in Irandegan Rural District, Irandegan District, Khash County, Sistan and Baluchestan Province, Iran. At the 2006 census, its population was 53, in 14 families.

References 

Populated places in Khash County